Chrostosoma enna is a moth of the subfamily Arctiinae. It was described by William Schaus in 1924. It is found in Colombia.

References

Biodiversity Heritage Library

Chrostosoma
Moths described in 1924